Lourdes Public School and Junior College is an English medium co-educational institution recognized by Central Board of Secondary Education, established in 1996 by Lourdes Educational Trust on behalf of the Lourdes Forane Church of the Archdiocese of Changanacherry. The school is located in the heart of Kottayam town, opposite the District Headquarters in the state of Kerala, India.

Administration 
The archbishop of Changanacherry is its patron and the vicar of Lourdes Forane Church is the manager. The manager together with the trustees of the church manages the day-to-day running of the school. The academic head is the Principal. The present patron is Mar Joseph Perumthottam, Archbishop of Changanacherry and the manager is Rev. Fr. Dr. Joseph Manakalam. The current principal is Rev. Fr. Manoj K. Mathew (Karukayil).

History 

Lourdes School had its first batch of students attending the AISSE examination of Central Board of Secondary Education in 2002. Initially the school provided only primary and secondary education. The higher secondary education was started in 2004 with institution of Junior College and the first batch wrote AISSCE examination in 2006. The school was awarded minority status by the National Minorities Commission in 2012.

Cultural activities and sports 
Apart from academic activities, the school also provides training in co-curricular activities. The school imparts training in cultural activities, such as vocal music, dance, painting and crafts, instrumental music and cooking. The school also participates in the CBSE youth festivals held under the banner of Sahodaya Association. 

Various clubs are organized and conduct debates, exhibitions, quizzes and study tours. In 2020, students won prizes in a quiz contest organized by the Department of Consumer Affairs and The Hindu. In 2014, students participated in a celebration of the Indian Space Research Organisation. The Students' Literary Association is held every week to provide opportunity to develop student talents. Every year elections to the school parliament are held to inculcate democratic values in students.

The school celebrates important days and festivals, like Onam, Independence Day and Christmas. The school also celebrates Teachers' day, with the older students taking over the teaching of the younger classes. Other important days in an academic year include Literary Association Inauguration, School Day celebration, Sports Day, and Arts Festival.

The school conducts an annual All Kerala School Basketball tournament for the Lourdean Trophy since 2003. The Physical Education Department also organizes various outdoor programs.

Publications 
The school has published an annual magazine titled Lourdean since 2001. The magazine includes literary works of the students and teachers. The Lourdean Voice is a newsletter to keep parents informed about day-to-day activities of the school and gives the students a chance to display their literary skills.

Scholarships 

 Fr. A.M. Mathew Munduvalayil Scholarship: The annual interest of rs.10,000/ given as a cash scholarships to the top scorer in the AISSE examination of the CBSE.
 Mar Joseph Powathil Scholarship: A cash scholarship for the student who scores the highest aggregate irrespective of the stream in the AISSCE Examination, in remembrance of the pastoral visit on 11 December 2005.
 Rev. Mani Puthiyidom Scholarship: For the top scores in the I - IX classes, instituted in honor of the dedicated services rendered by former Manager Rev. Dr. Mani Puthiyidom.
 Fr. Joseph M. Cheruvelil Scholarship: For the top scores in X, XI, XII classes, instituted in honor of the dedicated services rendered by Rev. Fr. Joseph M. Cheruvelil as the principal.

Facilities 
The school provides science labs, a computer lab, a language lab, a library, and guidance and counseling wings. The school ground has facilities for basketball, football, volleyball, shuttle, badminton, long jump, high jump, shot put, and other activities.

Rankings
Lourdes Public School was ranked 1st among the Co-ed day schools in Kottayam, 2nd in Kerala and 99th in India in the Indian Day Schools League Table by Education World for 2013.

References

External links 
 http://www.lourdespublicschool.com/home.php
 https://web.archive.org/web/20120716071753/http://www.lourdesforanechurch.com/school.php

Catholic schools in India
Central Board of Secondary Education
Christian schools in Kerala
Primary schools in Kerala
High schools and secondary schools in Kerala
Schools in Kottayam district
Educational institutions established in 1996
1996 establishments in Kerala